Possession Island is the largest of the Penguin Islands, a scattered group of islands to the south of Namibia.

It features arid and rocky ground, with occasional shrubbery and low vegetation where some species of bird nest, the African penguin among them. In the 1950s, the island had the largest population of African penguins in Namibia, with around 46,000 adults; however by 2001, only 2,000 remained. In 2008, a report published by WWF South Africa estimated around 1,400 penguins remained, with a continued decline of around 8% a year being observed in their numbers.

For several years, the island was a guano collecting spot, and therefore had a small population consisting of some people in charge of collecting the product.

The island was also known, in the 18th century, as Thompson's Island.

See also 
 List of Antarctic and subantarctic islands

References 

Islands of Namibia